Francho Serrano Gracía (born 17 October 2001) is a Spanish footballer who plays as a central midfielder for Real Zaragoza and Spain national U21 team.

Club career
Born in Zaragoza, Aragon, and joined Real Zaragoza's youth setup in 2015, aged 13. He made his senior debut with the reserves on 14 December 2019, starting in a 2–1 Tercera División home win against CD Brea.

On 23 March 2020, Serrano renewed his contract until 2024 and was definitely promoted to the first team for the 2020–21 season. He made his professional debut on 1 November, starting in a 0–0 home draw against RCD Mallorca in the Segunda División championship.

Serrano scored his first senior goal on 16 December 2020, netting the second in a 2–0 away win against Gimnástica de Torrelavega, for the season's Copa del Rey.

References

External links

2001 births
Living people
Footballers from Zaragoza
Spanish footballers
Association football midfielders
Segunda División players
Tercera División players
Real Zaragoza B players
Real Zaragoza players
Spain youth international footballers
Spain under-21 international footballers